The Oswego Netherlands were a minor league baseball team based in Oswego, New York, United States. From 1936 to 1940, the Netherlands played as members of the Class C level Canadian-American League, serving as a minor league affiliate of the Cleveland Indians in 1937 and 1938 and Washington Senators in 1939. The Oswego Netherlands hosted minor league home games at Otis Park. At age 17, Baseball Hall of Fame member Bob Lemon played for the 1938 Oswego Netherlands in his first professional season.

History
After minor league baseball began in 1885 with the Oswego Sweegs of the New York State League, the Oswego Netherlands were preceded by the 1907 Oswego Starchmakers, who won the championship in the final season of the Empire State League.

In 1936, the Oswego "Netherlands" began play in the six–team, Class C level Canadian–American League. Oswego joined the Brockville Pirates, Ogdensburg Colts, Ottawa Senators, Perth Blue Cats and Watertown Grays in beginning league play on May 20, 1936.

The "Netherlands" nickname corresponds with Oswego's history and culture. The British and Dutch had first established a settlement at and Forts at Oswego in 1722.

In their first season of Canadian–American League play, the Oswego Netherlands finished last. Oswego ended the 1936 season with a record of 32–51 record, as John Dashner and George Kunes served as managers. Oswego placed sixth, finishing 20.5 games behind the first place Perth Blue Cats.

The 1937 Oswego Netherlands became a minor league affiliate of the Cleveland Indians, placed second in the eight–team league and qualified for the playoffs. The Netherlands ended the Canadian–American League season with a record of 67–40. Riley Parker and Blane Kunes served as managers, as Oswego finished 1.5 games behind the first place Perth-Cornwall Grays. In the 1st round of the playoffs, the Ogdensburg Colts defeated Oswego 3 games to 1.

The Oswego Netherlands continued an affiliate of the Cleveland Indians in 1938. The Netherlands placed 6th in the1938 Canadian–American League standings with a record of 54–69, playing the season under manager Riley Parker. Oswego finished 27.0 games behind the 1st place Amsterdam Rugmakers.

In his first professional season, at age 17, Baseball Hall of Fame member Bob Lemon played for Oswego in 1938. In 75 games, Lemon hit .312 with 7 home runs as a hitter for Oswego. After advancing to the major leagues as a hitter, Lemon switched to pitching in 1946, leading to his pitching career with 7 All-Star game selections and 207 career wins. Playing as an outfielder in 1938, Lemon has been signed by the Cleveland Indians to a contract for $100.00 per month before reporting to Oswego.

The Oswego Netherlands placed second in 1939, becoming an affiliate of the Washington Senators. Oswego ended the eight–team Canadian–American League season with a record of 69–53, placing second and finishing 12.0 games behind the first place Amsterdam Rugmakers. Art Funk and Blaine Kunes served as managers. In the 1st round of playoff, Amsterdam Rugmakers defeated Oswego 4 games to 2.

In their final season of play, the Oswego Netherlands placed sixth in the Canadian–American League and did not qualify for the playoffs. The Netherlands ended the 1940 season with a record of 58–63, as Blaine Kunes and Art Funk again served as managers. Oswego finished 25.0 games behind the first place Ottawa-Ogdensburg Senators in the final regular season standings.

Oswego did not continue play in the 1941 Canadian–American League, as the franchise folded following the 1940 season. Oswego has not hosted another minor league team.

The ballpark
The Oswego Starchmakers played minor league home games at Otis Park. The ballpark had a capacity of 3,000 in 1936, with field dimensions of (Left, Center, Right): 550–585–428 in 1936 and 354–491–347 in 1939. The park was named for Oswego mayor John Otis. The grandstand was torn down in the 1950's, as Frederick Leighton Elementary School was built on the site. The ballpark was located at Hillside Avenue & Buccaneer Boulevard. 
Today, Leighton Elementary is located at 1 Buccaneer Boulevard.

Timeline

Year–by–year records

Notable alumni

Bill Kalfass (1940)
Bob Lemon (1938) Inducted into the Baseball Hall of Fame
Mike Naymick (1938)
Frank Skaff (1906)
Glenn Spencer (1940)
Vince Ventura (1940)

See also
Oswego Netherlands players

References

External links
 Oswego - Baseball Reference

Defunct minor league baseball teams
Baseball teams established in 1936
Baseball teams disestablished in 1940
1937 establishments in New York (state)
1940 disestablishments in New York (state)
Defunct baseball teams in New York (state)
Oswego, New York
Cleveland Guardians minor league affiliates
Washington Senators minor league affiliates